Roy Mason (13 December 1933 – 10 March 2017) was a British figure skater who competed in ice dancing. With partner Mary Parry, he won bronze at the 1960 European Championships in Garmisch-Partenkirchen, West Germany. Parry and Mason were both members of Birmingham Ice Dance Club and had started competing together by 1955.

Mason served as an ice dancing judge at the 1988 Winter Olympics. In his final years, he lived with Parry in Sutton Coldfield.

Competitive highlights 
With Mary Parry

References 

1933 births
2017 deaths
English male ice dancers
Figure skating judges
Sportspeople from Birmingham, West Midlands